Phyllospadix serrulatus is a species of aquatic plant in the Zosteraceae family. It is referred to by the common name toothed surfgrass, and is found along the shorelines of British Columbia and southern Alaska. It is also found in Oregon. It grows in salt marshes in the intertidal zone.

Phyllospadix serrulatus is a grass-like herb with leaves up to 60 cm long, with teeth along the margins toward the tip.

References

serrulatus
Salt marsh plants
Flora of Alaska
Flora of British Columbia
Biota of the Pacific Ocean
Taxa named by Franz Josef Ruprecht
Taxa named by Paul Friedrich August Ascherson